Lake Margrethe is near Grayling in Crawford County, Michigan.
It was formerly known as Portage Lake.
Fish species include: rock bass, yellow perch, bluegill, smallmouth bass, largemouth bass, northern pike, tiger muskie, and walleye.  
Portions of the Lake are within Camp Grayling.  It is a favorite fishing and recreation lake for soldiers in their off-duty hours.
There is also Lake Margrethe State Forest campground. This provides access for use by area residents, campers and tourists, who access the lake from the state forest campground located at its northwest corner.
Lake Margrethe was renamed after the wife of lumber baron Rasmus Hanson (1846-1927). Mr. Hanson also founded the Grayling Fish Hatchery in 1914, and contributed real estate in three counties to the State of Michigan for military training, now known as Camp Grayling.  Most of the lake is relatively shallow, especially the northernmost parts of the lake, those closest to M-72 Highway.  The western bay has areas that exceed 40 feet, and the southern bay has a maximum depth of around 65 feet in a single small hole.  Lake Margrethe is well known for its fishing.

See also
List of lakes in Michigan

References

External links
Grayling Area Visitors Bureau
Lake Margrethe State Forest Campground

Bodies of water of Crawford County, Michigan
Margrethe